Direct simulation Monte Carlo (DSMC) method uses probabilistic Monte Carlo simulation to solve the Boltzmann equation for finite Knudsen number fluid flows.

The DSMC method was proposed by Graeme Bird, emeritus professor of aeronautics, University of Sydney. DSMC is a numerical method for modeling rarefied gas flows, in which the mean free path of a molecule is of the same order (or greater) than a representative physical length scale (i.e. the Knudsen number Kn is greater than 1). In supersonic and hypersonic flows rarefaction is characterized by Tsien's parameter, which is equivalent to the product of Knudsen number and Mach number (KnM) or M/Re, where Re is the Reynolds number. In these rarefied flows, the Navier-Stokes equations can be inaccurate. The DSMC method has been extended to model continuum flows (Kn < 1) and the results can be compared with Navier Stokes solutions.

The DSMC method models fluid flows using probabilistic simulation molecules to solve the Boltzmann equation. Molecules are moved through a simulation of physical space in a realistic manner that is directly coupled to physical time such that unsteady flow characteristics can be modeled. Intermolecular collisions and molecule-surface collisions are calculated using probabilistic, phenomenological models. Common molecular models include the hard sphere model, the variable hard sphere (VHS) model, and the variable soft sphere (VSS) model. Various collision models are presented in. 

Currently, the DSMC method has been applied to the solution of flows ranging from estimation of the Space Shuttle re-entry aerodynamics to the modeling of microelectromechanical systems (MEMS).

DSMC Algorithm 
The direct simulation Monte Carlo algorithm is like molecular dynamics in that the state of
the system is given by the positions and velocities of the
Unlike molecular dynamics, each particle in a DSMC simulation represents  molecules in
the physical system that have roughly at the same position and velocity. 
This allows DSMC to rescale length and time for the modeling of macroscopic systems (e.g., atmospheric entry). 
density and each collision between simulation particles represents  collisions
among molecules in the physical system.
As a rule of thumb there should be 20 or more particles per cubic mean free path
for accurate results.

The evolution of the system is integrated in time steps, which are
typically on the order of the mean collision time for a particle. 
At each time step all the particles are moved and then a random set of pairs collide.
In the absence of external fields (e.g., gravity) the particles move ballistically as
.
Any particle that reaches a boundary or a surface has its position and velocity reset accordingly
(e.g., periodic boundary conditions).
After all the particles have moved, they are sorted into cells and some are randomly selected to collide.
based on probabilities and collision rates obtained from the kinetic theory of gases.
After the velocities of all colliding particles have been reset, statistical sampling is performed and then
the process is repeated for the next time step.

Collisions 
On each timestep the particles are sorted into spatial cells and only particles in the same cell
are allowed to collide. Typically the dimension of a cell is no larger than a mean free path.
All pairs of particles in a cell are candidate collision partners, regardless of their actual trajectories. 

The details of how collisions are calculated in DSMC depend on the molecular interaction model;
here we take the hard spheres model, which is the simplest.
proportional to their relative speed,

where  is the number of particles in the cell and the summations are over particles within the cell.
Because of the double sum in the denominator it can be computationally expensive to use this collision probability directly.
Instead, the following rejection sampling scheme can be used to select collision pairs:

 If the pair is accepted, the collision is processed; the velocities of the particles are reset but positions are unchanged.
 After the collision is processed or if the pair is rejected, return to step 1.

This procedure is correct even if the value
in the sense that more candidates are rejected.

After the collision pair is chosen, their post-collision velocities,
Writing the relative velocity in terms of  spherical angles,  and 

these angles are selected by a Monte Carlo process with distributions given by the collision model.
For the hard spheres model these angles are uniformly distributed over the unit sphere. 
where  is a  uniform deviate in [0, 1).
The polar angle is distributed according to the probability density,

Using the change of variable , we have  so 

The post-collision velocities are set as

Note that by conservation of linear momentum and energy the center of mass velocity
and the relative speed are unchanged in a collision. That is,

and

This process is repeated for every pair of colliding particles.

From the collision frequency, given by kinetic theory the total
number of hard sphere collisions in a cell during a time  is

Since collision candidates go through a rejection sampling procedure 
the ratio of total accepted to total candidates for hard sphere particles is

The number of collision candidates selected in a cell over a time step  is

This approach for determining the number of collisions is known as the No-Time-Counter (NTC) method.
If  is set excessively high then the algorithm processes the same number of collisions (on average)
but the simulation is inefficient because many candidates are rejected.

References

External links 
 Direct Simulation Monte Carlo Method: Visual Simulation Programs created by GA Bird.
 DSMC Demo Applet by Greg Khanlarov
 Course material on DSMC (part of Computational Physics tutorial by Franz J. Vesely, University of Vienna)
 Course material on DSMC and recent developments (given at IPAM UCLA by Lorenzo Pareschi, University of Ferrara)

Monte Carlo methods
Statistical mechanics